Oloupena Falls, or Oloupena Falls, is a waterfall located in the north-eastern part of Hawaiian Island of Molokai, and is unofficially cited as the fourth highest waterfall in the world, and the highest in the United States.

The falls occur where a short, seasonal stream spills over the edge of one of the tallest sea-side cliffs of the world, located between the Pelekunu and Wailau valleys. They have eroded a groove in the cliff-face and can be observed only from the ocean or air.

See also
List of waterfalls by height

References 

Waterfalls of Hawaii
Tiered waterfalls
Landforms of Molokai